The Palau fruit dove (Ptilinopus pelewensis) is a species of bird in the family Columbidae. It is endemic to Palau and it is also Palau's national bird.

Description
The species has a grey head, neck and breast with a purple cap and yellow line. There is an orange band across the lower breast and belly and olive-green back, wings and tail. Both sexes are alike. Juvenile birds resemble the adults but lack the purple cap, the green upperparts are lined with yellow and the belly is yellow.

Distribution and habitat
The Palau fruit dove is endemic to Palau, where it is common in all habitats across the island. The species declined due to hunting prior to 1945, but has rebounded with protection and is now common.

References

Ptilinopus
Birds of Palau
Endemic fauna of Palau
Endemic birds of Palau
Birds described in 1868
Taxonomy articles created by Polbot